Agrostis idahoensis is a species of grass known by the common name Idaho bent grass. It is native to western North America from Alaska to California to Colorado, where it grows in several habitat types.

Description
It is a perennial grass growing in short tufts up to 30 centimeters tall. The leaves are thready and a few centimeters long. The inflorescence is an open, thin array of wispy branches bearing spikelets each a few millimeters long.

External links

Jepson Manual Treatment
USDA Plants Profile
Photo gallery

idahoensis
Native grasses of California
Grasses of the United States
Grasses of Canada
Flora of the Western United States
Flora of Alaska
Flora of Western Canada
Flora of the Rocky Mountains
Flora of the Sierra Nevada (United States)
Flora without expected TNC conservation status